The Edumanom Forest Reserve is an area in the Niger Delta region of South East Nigeria, that is home to some of the last chimpanzees in Nigeria. It covers part of the old Nembe Kingdom, which is now divided into the Nembe and Brass local government areas, in Bayelsa State.

The Edumanom forest reserve is a freshwater swamp forest with an area of 9,324 hectares.
The habitat has been degraded by the oil industry and logging operations.  Although there are relatively few roads in the region, hunters can gain access to the forest through the creeks and along oil pipelines. The forest is also under threat from the expansion of oil palm plantations. A proposed federal road from Ogbia to Nembe would run between two of the patches inhabited by chimpanzees in the Edumanom forest.

In 1995, hunter's reports suggested that there were 5-10 small chimpanzee groups in the general area, probably with no more than 50 individuals. Older hunters tended to avoid chimpanzees, but younger hunters boasted of killing them. Young chimps captured as a result of hunting typically are sold as pets or to zoos. A June 2008 report noted that the reserve was the last known site for chimpanzees in the Niger Delta.

The reserve also shelters the endemic Sclater's guenon and other IUCN Red List species olive colobus and Niger Delta red colobus. The Sclater's monkey was considered vulnerable but not endangered in 2008. It is hunted throughout the area, except in very few places where it is held sacred and is managing to survive. A 2005 report recommended that it be protected within the Edumanom and other reserves in Nigeria.
There used to be red-capped mangabeys in the forest, but these are now thought to be extirpated.  The Edumanom was since proposed as a forest reserve but essentially is used and managed as community forest land. The site is about 87km2.The area overlaps both Ogbia and Nembe Local Government Area in Bayelsa State and includes patches of forests utilized by the Emago-Kugbo community in Rivers State.

References

Bayelsa State
Forest Reserves of Nigeria
Niger Delta swamp forests